Park Creek is a stream in the U.S. state of South Dakota. It is a tributary of Bear Butte Creek.

Park Creek was named from its natural park-like setting.

See also
List of rivers of South Dakota

References

Rivers of Lawrence County, South Dakota
Rivers of South Dakota